Seth Dankwa Wiafe is a Ghanaian Politician and a member of the Third Parliament of the Fourth Republic of Ghana.

Early life and education 
Wiafe was born at Akwapim South in the Eastern Region of Ghana. He is a lawyer and member of the General Council Ghana Bar Association.

Politics 
Wiafe was first elected into Parliament on the ticket of the National Democratic Congress during the 2000 Ghanaian General Elections representing the Akwapim South Constituency.  He was a member of the 3rd parliament of the 4th republic of Ghana.He polled 22,328 votes out the 39,955 valid votes casting representing  55.9%. The National Democratic Congress won a minority total of 92 parliamentary seats out of 200 seats in the 3rd parliament of the 4th republic of Ghana. He was beaten in the 2004 election by Magnus Opare-Asamoah (NPP) 0.70% against 56%. During his political work, Wiafe and his District Chief Executive (DCE), Andrew Y. Nyarko-Adu, were at each other's throat over allegations of bribery and diversion of illegal chain saw timber.

Career 
Wiafe is a Former Member of Parliament for the Akwapim South Constituency in the Eastern Region of Ghana from 2001 to 2005.

References 

Living people
Year of birth missing (living people)
National Democratic Congress (Ghana) politicians
Ghanaian MPs 2001–2005
People from Eastern Region (Ghana)
21st-century Ghanaian politicians
Government ministers of Ghana